Crane is a census-designated place and unincorporated community in Richland County, Montana, United States. Its population was 102 according to the 2010 census. Crane has a post office with the ZIP code 59217. Montana Highway 16 passes through Crane.

The town was named for trapper Jimmy Crain when the post office opened in 1910.

Demographics

Climate
According to the Köppen Climate Classification system, Crane has a semi-arid climate, which is abbreviated as "BSk" on climate maps.

References

Census-designated places in Richland County, Montana
Census-designated places in Montana